Huntsville is a city in Madison County and Limestone County, Alabama, United States, with a tiny portion extending into Morgan County. It is the county seat of Madison County. Located in the Appalachian region of northern Alabama, Huntsville is the most populous city in the state.

Huntsville was founded within the Mississippi Territory in 1805 and became an incorporated town in 1811. When Alabama was admitted as a state in 1819, Huntsville was designated for a year as the first capital, before that was moved to more central settlements. The city developed across nearby hills north of the Tennessee River, adding textile mills in the late nineteenth century.

Its major growth has taken place since World War II. During the war, the Army established Redstone Arsenal near here with a chemical weapons plant, and nearby related facilities. After the war, additional research was conducted at Redstone Arsenal on rockets, followed by adaptations for space exploration. NASA's Marshall Space Flight Center, the United States Army Aviation and Missile Command, and most recently the FBI's operational support headquarters all came to be located at nearby Redstone Arsenal. The National Trust for Historic Preservation included Huntsville in its "America's Dozen Distinctive Destinations for 2010" list.

The city's population was 215,006 at the 2020 census, making it Alabama's most populous city. Huntsville is the largest city in the five-county Huntsville-Decatur-Albertville, AL Combined Statistical Area. The Huntsville metropolitan area's population was 491,723 in 2020, making it the second most populous metropolitan area in the state after the Birmingham metropolitan area.

History

First settlers
Together with settlement pressures after the United States gained independence, this area had become largely empty of indigenous peoples by the turn of the 19th century. Revolutionary War veteran John Hunt was a pioneer in 1805 on land around the Big Spring. The US negotiated an 1805 treaty with the Chickasaw and an 1806 treaty with the Cherokee who ceded their claims to land to the federal government.

The area was subsequently purchased by LeRoy Pope, who named it Twickenham after the home village of his distant kinsman Alexander Pope. Twickenham was carefully planned, with streets laid out in a northeast to southwest direction based on the flow of Big Spring. Given anti-British sentiment during this period after the Revolution and with tensions leading to the War of 1812, in 1811 the town name was changed to "Huntsville" to honor pioneer John Hunt.

Both John Hunt and LeRoy Pope were Freemasons and charter members of Helion Lodge #1, the oldest lodge in Alabama.

Incorporation
In 1811, Huntsville became the first incorporated town in what is now Alabama. However, the recognized "founding" year of the city is 1805, the year of John Hunt's arrival.

David Wade settled in Huntsville in 1817. He built the David Wade House on the north side of what is now Bob Wade Lane (Robert B. Wade was David's grandson), just east of Mt. Lebanon Road. It had six rough Doric columns on the portico.

During the Great Depression, the Wade House was measured as part of the Historic American Buildings Survey (HABS) for preservation of historic buildings in the government's Archive. It was photographed by Frances Benjamin Johnston for the project, which was part of the Roosevelt administration's programs to hire workers during this critical period. The HABS project put architects, draftsmen, and photographers to work to create an inventory of documentation and photographs of significant properties across the country. The Wade house had already been abandoned for years and was considerably deteriorated. It was torn down in 1952. Today only the antebellum smokehouse survives on the property.

Emerging industries
Huntsville's initial growth was based on wealth generated by the sale of cotton from plantations, for which there was international demand, and trade associated with railroad industries. Many wealthy planters moved into the area from Virginia, Georgia, and the Carolinas to develop new cotton plantations. The invention of the cotton gin in the late eighteenth century meant that uplands areas could be profitably cultivated with short-staple cotton, which could be grown in a much larger area than the long-staple cotton of the Sea Islands and Low Country.

In 1819, Huntsville hosted a constitutional convention in Walker Allen's large cabinet-making shop. The 44 delegates wrote a constitution for the new state of Alabama. In accordance with the new state constitution, Huntsville became Alabama's first capital when the state was admitted to the Union. This was a temporary designation for one legislative session only. The capital was moved to more central cities in the state; to Cahaba, then to Tuscaloosa, and finally to Montgomery.

In 1855, the Memphis and Charleston Railroad was constructed through Huntsville, becoming the first railway to link the Atlantic seacoast with the lower Mississippi River.

Civil War

Huntsville initially opposed secession from the Union in 1861, but provided many men for the Confederacy's efforts. The 4th Alabama Infantry Regiment, led by Col. Egbert J. Jones of Huntsville, distinguished itself at the Battle of Manassas/Bull Run, the first major encounter of the American Civil War. The Fourth Alabama Infantry, which contained two Huntsville companies, were the first Alabama troops to fight in the war. They were also present when General Robert E. Lee surrendered to Grant at Appomattox Court House in April 1865. Nine generals of the war were born in or near Huntsville; five fought for the Confederacy and four for the Union. Other Huntsville residents joined the Union Army and helped establish the Union Army's 1st Alabama Cavalry Regiment.

On the morning of April 11, 1862, Union troops led by General Ormsby M. Mitchel seized Huntsville in order to sever the Confederacy's rail communications and gain access to the Memphis & Charleston Railroad. Huntsville was the control point for the Western Division of the Memphis & Charleston.

During the first occupation, Union officers took over many of the larger homes in the city while the enlisted soldiers camped in tents mainly on the outskirts. In the initial occupation, the Union troops searched for both Confederate troops hiding in the town and weapons. There was not a lot of resistance and they treated Huntsville residents in a relatively civil manner. However, residents of nearby towns reported harsher treatment. Union troops were forced to retreat a few months later. In the fall of 1863, they returned to Huntsville, using it as a base of operations for the war in the South until the last months of 1864. According to the journal of a nearby resident, Union troops burned many homes and villages in the surrounding countryside in retaliation for the active guerrilla warfare in the area. Many houses and buildings were burned, although most of Huntsville was kept intact as it housed both Union officers and troops.

After the Civil War

During the Reconstruction era, three delegates from Huntsville attended the 1867 Constitutional Convention including Andrew J. Applegate, originally from Ohio, who went on to serve as Alabama's first Lieutenant Governor. Councill Training School, which eventually became William Hooper Councill High School, was established for African American students. It was named for educator and school founder William Hooper Councill.

Huntsville became a center for cotton textile mills, such as Lincoln, Dallas, and Merrimack. Each mill company constructed worker housing outside the city, creating communities that eventually included schools, churches, grocery stores, theaters, and hardware stores, all within walking distance of the mill. In many such company towns, workers were required to buy goods at the company stores, which sometimes overcharged them. The mill owners also established rules for behavior and could throw out workers from housing if they violated these policies. As was common for the time, work was highly segregated with only whites being allowed to work inside the mills and Blacks regulated to working outside as laborers and groundskeepers.

In 1892 a local dairy cow called Lily Flagg broke the world record for butter production. Her Huntsville owner, General Samuel H. Moore, painted his house butter yellow and organized a party to celebrate, arranging for electric lights for the dance floor.  Before 1906 an area south of Huntsville was named Lily Flagg in the cow's honor. This area was later annexed by the city.

Great Depression 1930s
During the 1930s, industry declined in Huntsville due to the Great Depression. Huntsville became known as the Watercress Capital of the World because of its abundant harvest in the area. Madison County led Alabama in cotton production during this time.

World War II
By 1940, Huntsville was still relatively small, with a population of about 13,000 inhabitants. This quickly changed in early 1941 when the U.S. Army selected  of land adjoining the southwest area of the city for building three chemical munitions facilities: the Huntsville Arsenal, the Redstone Ordnance Plant (soon redesignated Redstone Arsenal), and the Gulf Chemical Warfare Depot. These operated throughout World War II, with combined personnel approaching 20,000. Resources in the area were strained as new workers flocked to the area, and the construction of housing could not keep up.

Missile development
At the end of the war in 1945, the munitions facilities were no longer needed. They were combined with the designation Redstone Arsenal (RSA), and a considerable political and business effort was made in attempts to attract new tenants. One significant start involved manufacturing the Keller automobile, but this closed after 18 vehicles were built. With the encouragement of US Senator John Sparkman (D-AL), the U.S. Army Air Force considered this for a major testing facility, but selected another site. Redstone Arsenal was prepared for disposal, but Sparkman used his considerable Southern Democratic influence (the Solid South controlled numerous powerful chairmanships of congressional committees) to persuade the Army to choose it as a site for rocket and missile development.

As the Korean War started, the Ordnance Guided Missile Center (OGMC) was given the mission to develop what eventually became the Redstone Rocket. This rocket set the stage for the United States' space program, as well as major Army missile programs, to be centered in Huntsville. Brigadier General Holger Toftoy commanded OGMC and the overall Redstone Arsenal. In early 1956, the Army Ballistic Missile Agency (ABMA) under Major General John Medaris was formed.

Resettlement of German scientists

In 1950, about 1,000 personnel were transferred from Fort Bliss, Texas, to Redstone Arsenal to form the Ordnance Guided Missile Center (OGMC). Central to this was a group of about 200 German scientists and engineers, led by Wernher von Braun; they had been brought from Nazi Germany to the United States by Colonel Holger Toftoy under Operation Paperclip following World War II. Assigned to the center at Huntsville, they settled and raised families.

Early American space flight

The city is nicknamed "The Rocket City" for its close association with U.S. space missions. On January 31, 1958, ABMA placed America's first satellite, Explorer 1, into orbit using a Jupiter-C launch vehicle, a descendant of the Redstone. This brought national attention to Redstone Arsenal and Huntsville, with widespread recognition of this being a major center for high technology.

Wernher von Braun was MSFC's initial director. On September 8, President Dwight D. Eisenhower formally dedicated the MSFC.

During the 1960s, the major mission of MSFC was in developing the Saturn boosters used by NASA in the Apollo Lunar Landing Program. For this, MSFC greatly increased its employees, and many new companies joined the Huntsville industrial community. The Cummings Research Park was developed just north of Redstone Arsenal to partially accommodate this industrial growth, and has now become the second-largest research park of this type in America.

Huntsville's economy was nearly crippled and growth almost came to a standstill in the 1970s following the closure of the Apollo program. However, the emergence of the Space Shuttle, the International Space Station, and a wide variety of advanced research in space sciences led to a resurgence in NASA-related activities that has continued into the 21st century. In addition, new Army organizations have emerged at Redstone Arsenal, particularly in the ever-expanding field of missile defense.

Geography

Situated in the Tennessee River valley, Huntsville is partially surrounded by several plateaus and large hills. These plateaus are associated with the Cumberland Plateau, and are locally called "mountains". Monte Sano Mountain (Spanish for "Mountain of Health") is the most notable and is east of the city, along with Round Top (Burritt), Chapman, Huntsville, and Green mountains. Others are Wade Mountain to the north, Rainbow Mountain to the west, and Weeden and Madkin mountains on the Redstone Arsenal property in the south. Brindley Mountain is visible in the south across the Tennessee River.

As with other areas along the Cumberland Plateau, the land around Huntsville is karst in nature. The city was founded around the Big Spring, which is a typical karst spring. Many caves perforate the limestone bedrock underneath the surface, as is common in karst areas. The National Speleological Society is headquartered in Huntsville.

Climate
Huntsville has a humid subtropical climate (Köppen climate classification Cfa). It experiences hot, humid summers and generally mild winters, with average high temperatures ranging from near  in the summer to  during winter.

Huntsville is near the center of a large area of the U.S. mid-South that has maximum precipitation in the winter and spring, not summer.  The average yearly precipitation is more than 54 inches. On average, the wettest single month is December, but Huntsville has a prolonged wetter season from November to May, with (on average) nearly or over 5 or more inches of precipitation most of those months. On average, August to October represent slightly drier months (see climate chart, showing less than 3.6 inches of precipitation these months). Droughts can occur, primarily August through October, but usually there is enough rainfall to keep soils moist and vegetation lush. Much of Huntsville's precipitation is delivered by thunderstorms. Thunderstorms are most frequent during the spring, and the most severe storms occur during the spring and late fall. These storms can deliver large hail, damaging straight-line winds, and tornadoes. Huntsville lies in a region colloquially known as Dixie Alley, an area more prone to violent, long-track tornadoes than most other parts of the US.

On April 27, 2011, the largest tornado outbreak on record, the 2011 Super Outbreak, affected northern Alabama. During this event, an EF5 tornado that tracked near the Browns Ferry Nuclear Power Plant destroyed many transmission towers and caused a multi-day power outage for the majority of North Alabama. That same tornado also resulted in considerable damage to the Anderson Hills subdivision and in Harvest, Alabama. In total, nine people were killed in Madison County, and many others were injured. Other significant tornado events include the Super Outbreak in April 1974, the November 1989 tornado that killed 21 and injured over 460, and the 1995 Anderson Hills tornado that killed one person and caused extensive damage. On January 21, 2010, an EF2 tornado struck Huntsville, resulting in moderate damage. Because it was not rain-wrapped and was easily photographed, it received extensive media coverage.

While most winters have some measurable snow, heavy snow is rare in Huntsville. However, there have been some unusually heavy snowstorms, like the New Year's Eve 1963 snowstorm, when  fell within 24 hours. Likewise, the Blizzard of 1993 and the Groundhog Day snowstorm in February 1996 were substantial winter events for Huntsville.

Demographics

2020 census

As of the 2020 United States census, there were 215,006 people and 91,048 households in the city. The racial makeup of the city was 59.9% White, 30.9% Black or African American, 0.4% Native American, 2.2% Asian, 0.1% Pacific Islander, and 4.3% from two or more races. Hispanic or Latino people of any race were 6.4% of the population.

2010 census

As of the 2010 United States census, there were 180,105 people, 77,033 households, and 45,416 families residing in the city. There were 84,949 housing units at an average housing density of 405.3 per square mile (156.9/km2). The racial makeup of the city was 61.3% White, 30.7% Black or African American, 0.4% Native American, 2.6% Asian, 0.1% Pacific Islander, 2.9% from other races, and 2.8% from two or more races. Hispanic or Latino people of any race were 6.2% of the population.

There were 77,033 households, out of which 24.9% had children living with them, 40.1% were married couples living together, 14.5% had a female householder with no husband present, and 41.0% were non-families. 34.7% of all households were made up of individuals, and 10.2% had someone living alone who was 65 years of age or older. The average household size was 2.25 and the average family size was 2.91.

2000 census
As of the 2000 United States census, there were 158,216 people, 66,742 households, and 41,713 families residing in the city. The racial makeup of the city was 64.47% White, 30.21% Black or African American, 0.54% Native American, 2.22% Asian, 0.06% Pacific Islander, 0.66% from other races, and 1.84% from two or more races. Hispanic or Latino people of any race were 2.04% of the population. Non-Hispanic Whites were 58% of the population in 2010, compared to 86.9% in 1970.

There were 66,742 households, out of which 27.6% had children living with them, 45.5% were married couples living together, 13.7% had a female householder with no husband present, and 37.5% were non-families. 32.3% of all households were made up of individuals, and 9.2% had someone living alone who was 65 years of age or older. The average household size was 2.29 and the average family size was 2.91. Same-sex couple households comprised 0.5% of all households.

Economy
Huntsville's main economic influence is derived from aerospace and military technology. Redstone Arsenal, Cummings Research Park (CRP), and NASA's Marshall Space Flight Center comprise the main hubs for the area's technology-driven economy. CRP is the second largest research park in the United States and the fourth largest in the world. The University of Alabama in Huntsville is a center for technology and engineering research in the area. There are commercial technology companies such as the network access company ADTRAN, computer graphics company Intergraph and designer and manufacturer of IT infrastructure Avocent. Cinram manufactures and distributes 20th Century Fox DVDs and Blu-ray discs out of their Huntsville plant. Sanmina-SCI has a presence in the area. A number of Fortune 500 companies have operations in Huntsville.

Retail
There are several strip malls and shopping malls throughout the city. Huntsville has one enclosed mall, Parkway Place, built in 2002 on the site of the former Parkway City Mall.  A larger mall built in 1984, Madison Square Mall, was closed in 2017 and the site is being redeveloped into a lifestyle center, named Mid City. There is also a lifestyle center named Bridge Street Town Centre, completed in 2007, in Cummings Research Park.

Space and defense
Huntsville remains the center for rocket-propulsion research in NASA and the Army. The Marshall Space Flight Center has been designated to develop NASA's Space Launch System (SLS), and the U.S. Army Aviation and Missile Command (AMCOM) is responsible for developing a variety of rocket-based tactical weapons.

Automobiles
Toyota Motor Manufacturing Alabama was constructed in 2003 and is located in North Huntsville Industrial Park. The plant has 1,800 employees as of 2022. The plant manufactures engines for Toyota vehicles.

The Mazda Toyota Manufacturing USA was constructed in 2021 with a plan to hire 4,000 employees. The facility produces Toyota and Mazda SUVs and pickup trucks. The majority of the plant is located in Huntsville, however the southern third is located in the unincorporated community of Greenbrier.

Technology

Biotechnology 
More than 25 biotechnology firms have developed in Huntsville due to the Huntsville Biotech Initiative. The HudsonAlpha Institute for Biotechnology is part of the  Cummings Research Park. The non-profit HudsonAlpha Institute has contributed genomics and genetics work to the Encyclopedia of DNA Elements (ENCODE).  For-profit business ventures within the Biotech Campus focus on subjects such as diagnosing disease, immune responses to cancer, protein crystallization, lab-on-a-chip technologies, and agricultural technologies. The University of Alabama in Huntsville (UAH) created a doctoral program in biotechnology to help develop scientists to support HudsonAlpha in addition to the emerging biotechnology economy in Huntsville.

Meta 
In 2018, Meta broke ground on a $1.5 billion data center in North Huntsville Industrial Park, and was opened in 2021. In June 2022, they announced they would be expanding the facility to seven buildings across a 3.5 million square foot area, but paused construction in December. The company advertised that the facility runs on 100% renewable energy and provides 300+ jobs to the community.

Arts and culture

Historic districts
Twickenham Historic District was chosen as the name of the first of three of the city's historic districts. It features homes in the Federal and Greek Revival architectural styles introduced to the city by Virginia-born architect George Steele about 1818. The 1819 Weeden House Museum was home to female artist and poet Howard Weeden, whose watercolors include portraits of African Americans. Old Town Historic District contains a variety of styles (Federal, Greek Revival, Queen Anne, and California cottages), with homes dating from the late 1820s through the early 1900s.

Five Points Historic District, consists predominantly of bungalows built around the beginning of the 20th century, by which time Huntsville was becoming a mill town. Merrimack Mill Village Historic District is a historic district developed around the Merrimack Cotton Mill in 1900. The district features homes following a number of similar floor plans that reflect those popular during the 19th century in the South.

Lowe Mill Village and Lincoln Mill and Mill Village Historic District were established during the textile boom of the 1890s and were recognized for their historical importance in 2011, along with Dallas Mill Village.

Museums
EarlyWorks Family of Museums runs multiple museums in Huntsville. EarlyWorks Children's Museum is an interactive history museum. Alabama Constitution Village features eight reconstructed Federal style buildings, with living-museum displays downtown. The Huntsville Depot, completed in 1860, is the oldest extant railroad depot in Alabama and one of the oldest extant depots in the United States.

Burritt on the Mountain, located on Monte Sano Mountain, is a regional history museum and event venue featuring a 1950s mansion, interpretive historic park, nature trails, and scenic overlooks. Harrison Brothers Hardware Store, established in 1879, is the oldest operating hardware store in Alabama. Now owned by the Historic Huntsville Foundation, it is still a working store and museum, featuring craftsmen. Huntsville Museum of Art in Big Spring International Park offers permanent displays, traveling exhibitions, and educational programs. North Alabama Railroad Museum features locomotives, coach cars, and other train cars.

United States Space & Rocket Center is features the United States Space Camp, Aviation Challenge, and the only Saturn V rocket designated a National Historic Landmark. The U.S. Veterans Memorial Museum displays more than 30 military vehicles from World War I to the present, including the world's oldest jeep, artifacts, and small arms dating back to the Revolutionary War.

Festivals 
Panoply Arts Festival occurs spring, and includes demonstrations, performances, competitions, workshops, and fireworks.

The Rocket City Brewfest is an craft beer festival occurring each May.

The Cigar Box Guitar Festival occurs each June, and is the world's longest running Cigar Box Guitar festival, featuring live music using home made instruments.

The Galaxy of Lights is a holiday-themed light showcase hosted by the Huntsville Botanical Garden each winter. The Botanical Garden hosts a fun-run through the event.

Libraries
Branches of the Huntsville-Madison County Public Library include: Bailey Cove Branch Library, Bessie K. Russell Branch Library, Downtown Huntsville Library, Eleanor E. Murphy Branch Library, Oscar Mason Branch Library, and Showers Center Library. The Downtown Huntsville Library has Alabama's highest materials circulation rate, and features a historical resource archive.

Performing arts
Arts Huntsville (TAC) includes over 100 local arts organizations and advocates, and promotes visual arts with two galleries: art@TAC, and JavaGalleria. TAC supports Create Huntsville, a county initiative to expand arts and cultural opportunities.

Music 
The Huntsville Community Chorus Association (HCCA) is one of Alabama's oldest performing arts organizations, with its first performance dating to December 1946. HCCA produces chorale concerts and musical theater productions. The Huntsville Symphony Orchestra (HSO) is Alabama's oldest continuously operating professional symphony orchestra, featuring performances of classical, pops and family concerts, and music education programs in public schools. Huntsville Chamber Music Guild was organized in 1952 to promote and present chamber music programs; the group seeks to present recitals in which artists are presented in works of the classical masters.

The Huntsville Youth Orchestra was founded by Russell Gerhart, founding conductor of the Huntsville Symphony Orchestra, in 1961. The HYO is a non-profit corporation whose purpose is to "foster, promote, and provide the support necessary for students from North Alabama to experience musical education in an orchestral setting." The organization has six ensembles: the Huntsville Youth Symphony, Sinfonia, Philharmonia, Concert Orchestra, Intermezzo Orchestra, and Novice Strings.

Theatre 
Broadway Theatre League was founded in 1959. BTL presents a season of national touring Broadway productions each year, a family-fun show, and additional season specials. Shows are presented in the Von Braun Center's Mark C. Smith Concert Hall. 

Theatre Huntsville, the result of a merger between the Twickenham Repertory Company (1979–1997) and Huntsville Little Theatre (1950–1997), is a 501(c)(3), non-profit, all-volunteer arts organization that presents six plays each season in the Von Braun Center Playhouse. Theatre Huntsville also presents drama-related workshops (stage management, stage makeup, etc.), as announced.

Fantasy Playhouse Children's Theatre, Huntsville's oldest children's theater, was founded in 1961. Fantasy Playhouse Theater Academy, the organization's dance, music, and art school, teaches children and adults each year. Fantasy Playhouse regularly produces three plays a year with an additional play, A Christmas Carol, produced early each December. 

Independent Musical Productions (IMP), was founded in 1993 and stages musical productions featuring talented volunteers from the community. Three Broadway-style musicals are presented throughout the year at the Mainstage Theatre at Lee High School, as well as several Cabaret performances at smaller local venues to round out each season. IMP is a 501(c)(3)non-profit organization and offers technical and performance workshops for the community.

Other 
Merrimack Hall Performing Arts Center is a 501(c)(3) nonprofit organization that opened in 2007, after being renovated from a textile factory to a performing arts center. Merrimack Hall includes a 300-seat performance hall, a  dance studio, and rehearsal and instructional spaces for musicians. Merrimack's Happy HeARTs program offers arts and social opportunities for special needs individuals.

Ars Nova School of the Arts is a conservatory for music and performing arts. Ars Nova produces musical theatre, opera, and operetta for the local stage.

Visual arts
The Huntsville Museum of Art opened in 1970. It purchased the largest privately owned, permanent collection of art by American women in the U.S., featuring Anna Elizabeth Klumpke, among others. The Huntsville Photographic Society started in 1956. A non-profit organization, the HPS is dedicated to furthering the art and science of photography in North Alabama. The Huntsville Art League started in 1957, adopting the name "The Huntsville Art League and Museum Association" (HALMA). In addition to their Visiting Artists and "Limelight Artists" series, which highlight both nonresident and member artists at the home office, HAL features its members' works at galleries located in the Jane Grote Roberts Auditorium of the Huntsville-Madison County Public Library Main Branch, the Heritage Club, and the halls of the Huntsville Times.

Convention center and arena
Both the arena and concert hall have undergone major renovations; as a result, they have been rechristened the Propst Arena and the Mark C. Smith Concert Hall, respectively.

Local breweries
A number of local breweries are located in Huntsville. Straight to Ale Brewery opened in 2010 in North Huntsville, later relocated to South Huntsville, and then moved to Campus 805 in West Huntsville. Yellowhammer Brewing opened in 2010 in West Huntsville. It later moved to a new facility at Campus 805 in West Huntsville. Salty Nut Brewery opened in 2013 in North Huntsville and moved to West Huntsville on brewery row. Green Bus Brewing in downtown Huntsville opened in late 2015.

Comedy
Huntsville is home to a number of comedy shows and venues. Stand Up Live is a comedy venue near Downtown. Awesome Comedy Hour takes place at alcohol store Liquor Express in Western Huntsville.

Other
The National Speleological Society is headquartered in Huntsville on Cave Street. The Von Braun Astronomical Society has two observatories and a planetarium on 10 acres (40,000 m2) in Monte Sano State Park. The Three Caves is a former rock quarry which now has concerts during the summer.

Sports
Huntsville is home to a number of adult sports teams and leagues. The Huntsville Havoc are a professional ice hockey team with the Southern Professional Hockey League that play home games at the Von Braun Center. The Huntsville Adult Soccer League is an amateur adult soccer league with seven teams, including four men's divisions, a premier team, a women's team, and a master's team. They play at Merrimack Sports Complex. The Rocket City Roller Derby is part of the Women's Flat Track Derby Association (WFTDA) and plays at the NSS Conference Center. The Alabama-Huntsville Chargers (University of Alabama in Huntsville) Men's and Women's Basketball teams are part of NCAA D-II and play at Spragins Hall. The Alabama A&M Bulldogs (Alabama A&M University) Men's Football team is part of NCAA D-I FCS.

Huntsville's largest stadium is the Von Braun Center with a maximum arena seating capacity of 9,000. Toyota Field is a baseball park with a capacity of about 7,500, home to the Trash Pandas in nearby Madison. A number of smaller stadiums are used by universities or public schools, including Joe Davis Stadium with a capacity of 6,000, Louis Crews Stadium with a capacity of 21,000, and Milton Frank Stadium with a capacity of 12,000. The Merrimack Soccer Complex has 14 soccer fields used by youth soccer organizations. The Huntsville Speedway is a quarter mile oval race track used for race days and other events.

Huntsville has had many professional sports teams in its past, most of which were discontinued due to lack of funding or being transferred to a different city. Huntsville's first sports team was the Huntsville Rockets football team, launched in 1962 and folded in 1967 due to lack of funding. The Alabama Hawks were a football team founded in 1963 and were discontinued in 1969 due to lack of funding. The Huntsville Stars were a Minor League Baseball team founded in 1985, originally as the Nashville Sounds in Nashville, Tennessee, but were transferred to Huntsville soon after. They were transferred to Biloxi, Mississippi in 2014, being renamed as the Biloxi Shuckers. The Huntsville Blast were a minor league ice hockey team, originally founded in 1981 as the Roanoke Valley Rampage in Vinton, Virginia, and were relocated to Huntsville in 1993. The following season, the team was relocated to Tallahassee, Florida as the Tallahassee Tiger Sharks. The Huntsville Fire were an indoor soccer team founded in 1997 and dissolved in 1998 due to lack of funding. The Huntsville Channel Cats were an ice hockey team founded in 1995 and renamed the Huntsville Havoc in 2004. The Huntsville Flight were a basketball team founded in 2001 and were moved to Albuquerque, New Mexico in 2005. Today, they are the Cleveland Charge. The Tennessee Valley Raptors were an indoor football team established in 2000 and relocated to Rockford, Illinois in 2005. The Alabama Hammers were an indoor football team established in 2010 and folded in 2016 due to the collapse of the league.

Parks and recreation

There are more than 60 parks within the city limits of Huntsville. In 2013, for the fifth time in seven years, Huntsville was named a 'Playful City USA' by KaBOOM! (non-profit organization) for their efforts to provide a variety of play opportunities for children that included after school programs and parks within walking distance of home.

Huntsville's most popular park is Big Spring International Park in downtown Huntsville, centered on a natural water body (Big Spring). The park contains the Huntsville Museum of Art. Festivals like Panoply Arts Festival and the Big Spring Jam are held around the park. Fish and ducks live in the spring and in surrounding water bodies. There is a waterfall and a constantly lit gas torch. Creekwood Park is a  park with a children's playground and dog park that connects to the Indian Creek Greenway.

Burritt on the Mountain atop Monte Sano Mountain features an eccentric, mid-century mansion and museum, an interpretive historic park depicting rural life in the 19th century, educational programs for children and adults, accessible nature trails, and functions as a venue for popular regional events throughout the year. The Huntsville Botanical Garden's  site features educational programs, woodland paths, grassy meadows, and vast floral collections. Lydia Gold Skatepark in downtown has  of cement for skateboarding and rollerblading.

Land Trust of North Alabama is a member supported, non-profit organization dedicated to the conservation of the natural heritage of the area. Volunteers have created and maintain  of public trails – all of which are within the Huntsville city limits.

Other state parks nearby include Cathedral Caverns in Woodville, Lake Guntersville State Park in Guntersville, and Joe Wheeler State Park in Rogersville.

Golf courses
There are six main golf courses in Huntsville. Hampton Cove is one of the eleven courses making up the Robert Trent Jones Golf Trail, featuring two championship 18-hole courses, one par-three course, and a driving range Sunset Landing Golf Course offers an 18-hole golf course next to Huntsville International Airport. The Links on Redstone Arsenal is available for Military, NASA, and others that have base access. The Links has four separate 9-hole courses (two of which can be used for footgolf) and a driving range. The Ledges is an exclusive 18-hole championship golf course, also offering a banquet hall, grand hall, and a number of meeting rooms at their clubhouse. Huntsville Country Club offers an 18-hole course and driving range, as well as a banquet hall, pool, and TrackMan room, all exclusive to club members. Valley Hill Country Club offers a 27-hole course and facilities for rental, exclusive to members.

Government

The current mayor of Huntsville is Tommy Battle, who was first elected in 2008 and then re-elected in 2012, 2016, and 2020. The City Administrator is John Hamilton, who replaced Rex Reynolds on January 1, 2014, when Reynolds retired.

The city has a five-member (per each district) City Council. Council elections are staggered, meaning that Districts 2, 3, and 4 had elections in August 2018, while Districts 1 and 5 had elections simultaneously with mayoral elections in 2020. The city has boards and commissions which control most public services and development projects. In 2020, the city announced that they'd be building a new $80 million city, planned to centralize all boards and committees in one building.

In July 2007, then Senator Barack Obama held the first fundraiser in Alabama for his presidential campaign in Huntsville. Obama ended up winning the Alabama Democratic Primary in Madison County by large margins in 2008. In the general election, John McCain carried Madison County with 57% of the vote. In the 2016 general election, Donald Trump (R) carried Madison County with 55% of the vote, with Hillary Clinton (D) receiving 38%, and Gary Johnson (L) receiving 4%. In 2022, former Rep. Mo Brooks (R-5th Congressional District, AL) announced his retirement from the U.S. House of Representatives to run for the Senate. In November, Dale Strong won the election to replace Mo Brooks.

Education

K–12 education

Most K–12 students in Huntsville attend Huntsville City Schools. In the 2020–2021 school year 23,514 students attended Huntsville City Schools. According to U.S. News & World Report, "49% of high school students tested at or above the proficient level for reading, and 45% tested at or above that level for math". They also stated that high schoolers have a 92% graduation rate.

Of the 46 schools in the Huntsville City Schools system in 2020-2021, there were:
 26 Preschools (Pre-K)
 28 Elementary schools (K–5)

 14 Middle schools (grades 6–8)
 6 high Schools (grades 9–12)
 3 special centers (two Schools of Choice and one Program of Choice)

Huntsville City Schools also offers six magnet programs at existing schools: three programs for grades 9-12, two for 6-8, and one for both.

The section in Morgan County is within the Morgan County School District. A few parcels of Huntsville in Madison County are in the Madison County School District, and a few parcels in Limestone County are in the Limestone County School District.

Several private, parochial, and religious schools serve grades pre-K–12. The city has several private Christian schools, including Saint John Paul II Catholic High School, Oakwood Adventist Academy, Whitesburg Christian Academy, Grace Lutheran School, and Westminster Christian Academy. Randolph School is Huntsville's only independent, private K-12 school.

Higher education
Huntsville has four main higher education institutions. The University of Alabama in Huntsville is the largest university serving the greater Huntsville area, with 9,636 undergraduate students in 2022-2023. About half of its graduates earn a degree in engineering or science, making it one of the larger producers of engineers and physical scientists in Alabama. The Carnegie Foundation ranks the school very highly as a research institution, placing it among the top 75 public research universities in the nation. Alabama A&M University is the oldest university in the Huntsville area, dating to 1875. With over 5,000 students, it is home to the AAMU Historic District with 28 buildings and four structures listed in the United States National Register of Historic Places. Oakwood University, founded in 1896, is a Seventh-day Adventist university with over 1,300 students and a member institution of the United Negro College Fund. J.F. Drake State Community and Technical College, founded in 1961, is a public technical college with 872 students as of 2022. In 2021, it was one of six institutions to receive NASA’s Inclusion Across the Nation of Communities of Learners of Underrepresented Discoverers in Engineering and Science Award, being awarded nearly $1.2 million expand its STEM workforce development programs and offer free STEM programs to middle and high schools in the area.

Various colleges and universities have satellite locations or extensions in Huntsville. Calhoun Community College's Cummings Research Park location offers in-person technical and medical programs. Columbia College's Redstone Arsenal location and Embry-Riddle Aeronautical University's Redstone Arsenal location offer higher education programs in-person and online to military individuals and their families. Faulkner University's Research Park location and Strayer University's Research Park offers in-person and online learning. Georgia Institute of Technology's Redstone Arsenal research institute is the, "Development and technology home for Army Air Defense Systems, Missile Defense Systems, Rotary Wing Aviation Technology and more..." and offers professional training in those areas.

Several medical centers and universities with medical programs offer education in medicine. University of Alabama at Birmingham's Huntsville Regional Medical Campus offers a number of on-site programs, including the Family Medicine Residency, Internal Medicine Residency, and Obstetrics and Women's Health Fellowship. The campus also serves as a physician practice for the public. Ross Medical Education Center in Research Park offer 36-week experience programs in medicine, dentistry, and veterinary medicine fields. Huntsville Hospital offers an accredited school of radiology.

Media

Newspapers and magazines
The Huntsville Times has been Huntsville's only daily newspaper since 1996, when the Huntsville News closed. Before then, the News was the morning paper, and the Times was the afternoon paper until 2004. The Times has a weekday circulation of 60,000, which rises to 80,000 on Sundays. Both papers were owned by the Newhouse chain.

In May 2012, Advance Publications, owner of the Times, announced that the Times would become part of a new company called the Alabama Media Group, along with the other three newspapers and two websites owned by Advance. As part of the change, the newspapers moved to a three-day publication schedule, with print editions available only on Wednesday, Friday and Sunday. The Huntsville Times and its sister papers publish news and information seven days a week on AL.com.

A few alternative newspapers are available in Huntsville. The Redstone Rocket is a newspaper distributed throughout Redstone Arsenal's housing area covering activities on Redstone. Speakin' Out News is a weekly newspaper focused on African Americans.

Huntsville Magazine is a quarterly lifestyle magazine, which, "Serves as a guide to the best of the city with insightful reads on culture, people, entertainment, and businesses catalyzing the city’s transformation."

Radio and television

Huntsville is the 108th largest radio market in the United States. Station KIH20 broadcasts the National Weather Service's forecasts and warnings for the Huntsville area.

The Huntsville DMA serves Madison, Limestone, and Morgan counties. Major stations include WHNT 19.1 CBS, WHIQ 25.1 PBS/Alabama Public Television, WAFF 48.1 NBC, and WZDX 54.1 FOX.

Film
A few feature films have been shot in Huntsville, including 20 Years After (2008, originally released as Like Moles, Like Rats) and Constellation (2005). Columbia Pictures filmed Ravagers (1979) in The Land Trust's Historic Three Caves Quarry, at the U.S. Space and Rocket Center, and at an antebellum home. Dark Entities (2022) takes place in Huntsville and was filmed throughout North Alabama.

Huntsville's legacy in the space program continues to draw film producers looking for background material for space-themed films. During the pre-production of Apollo 13 (1995), the cast and crew spent time at Space Camp and Marshall Space Flight Center preparing for their roles.

Infrastructure

Transportation

Huntsville is served by several U.S. Highways, including 72, 231, 431 and an Interstate highway spur, I-565, that links Huntsville and Decatur to I-65. Alabama Highway 53 also connects the city with I-65 in Ardmore, Tennessee. Major roadways include University Drive, Governors Drive, Airport Road, Memorial Parkway and Research Park Blvd.

Public transit
Public transit in Huntsville is run by the city's Department of Parking and Public Transit. The Huntsville Orbit runs 11 fixed routes throughout the city, mainly around downtown and major shopping areas like Memorial Parkway and University Drive and has recently expanded some of the buses to include bike racks on the front for a trial program. The city runs Access, a demand-response transit system for the handicapped, and CommuteSmart, a county-wide carpooling program.

Railroads
Huntsville has two active commercial rail lines. The mainline is run by Norfolk Southern, which runs from Memphis to Chattanooga, Tennessee. The original depot for this rail line, the Huntsville Depot, still exists as a railroad museum, though it no longer offers passenger service.

Another rail line, formerly part of the Louisville and Nashville Railroad (L&N), successor to the Nashville, Chattanooga and St. Louis Railway (NC&StL), is being operated by the Huntsville and Madison County Railroad Authority (HMCRA). This service, in continuous operation since 1894, presently hauls freight and provides transloading facilities at its downtown depot location. Until the mid-1950s, the L&N provided freight and passenger service to Guntersville and points South. The rail cars were loaded onto barges at Hobbs Island. The barge tows were taken upstream through the Guntersville Dam & Locks and discharged at Port Guntersville. Remnants of the track supporting piers still remain in the river just upstream from Hobbs Island. The service ran twice daily. L&N abandoned the line in 1984, at which time it was acquired by the newly created HMCRA, a state agency.

A third line, the Mercury and Chase Railroad, runs  weekend tourist rides on part of another former NC&StL and L&N line from the North Alabama Railroad Museum's Chase Depot, located in the community of Chase, Alabama. Their collection includes one of the oldest diesel locomotives in existence (1926). The rail line originally connected Huntsville to NC&StL's Nashville-to-Chattanooga mainline in Decherd, Tennessee. The depot was once the smallest union station in the United States when it served the NC&StL and Memphis and Charleston Railroad, the predecessor to the Norfolk Southern.

Air service

Huntsville International Airport is served by several regional and national carriers, including Delta Air Lines, United Airlines, Breeze Airways, Silver Airways and American Airlines. Delivery companies have hubs in Huntsville, making flights to Europe, Asia, and Mexico. The airport was reported to have the highest fares in the United States in 2014.

Huntsville is also served by the Meridianville–located Madison County Executive Airport, sometimes denoted as Huntsville Executive Airport due to its proximity to the city. The airport is a general aviation airport and does not have any regularly-scheduled commercial services.

Ports
The inland Port of Huntsville combines the Huntsville International Airport, International Intermodal Center, and Jetplex Industrial Park for truck, train and air transport. The intermodal terminal transfers truck and train cargo to aircraft. The port has on-site U.S. Customs and USDA inspectors. The port is Foreign Trade Zone No. 83.

Bicycle routes
There are several bicycle routes in the city. In 2015, Alabama and Huntsville were not considered bicycle friendly.  There are bike paths for exercise available.  Huntsville's government is working to improve bicycle network within the city limits. In 2020, Huntsville released a master plan for a 70-mile bicycling and walking trail, named Singing River Trail of North Alabama, to connect downtown Huntsville to the cities of Madison, Decatur, and Athens.

Utilities
Electricity, water, and natural gas are all provided in Huntsville by Huntsville Utilities (HU).  HU purchases and resells power from the Tennessee Valley Authority. TVA has two plants that provide electricity to the Huntsville area: Browns Ferry Nuclear Power Plant in Limestone County and Guntersville Dam in Marshall County. A third, Bellefonte Nuclear Power Plant in Jackson County, was built in the 1980s but was never activated. TVA attempted to sell the plant in 2016, but withdrew from the deal, stating they couldn't sell the plant under the Atomic Energy Act of 1954.

Telephone service in Huntsville is provided by AT&T, EarthLink, WOW!, and Comcast. Comcast and WOW! are the two cable providers in the Huntsville city limits. Mediacom operates in rural outlying areas. AT&T announced the start of its DSL U-verse service in the Huntsville-Decatur metro area in November 2010. AT&T and Google offer fiber internet service across the city.

Public safety

Fire
The Huntsville Fire and Rescue provides fire protection for the city. On a daily basis the department staffs and coordinates twenty-one engine companies, five ladder trucks, four rescue trucks, along with a Special Operations Division that includes Hazardous Materials Units, Technical Rescue Units, and several specialized support units. Huntsville Fire & Rescue also has Fire Investigations, emergency response dispatch, logistics, and training divisions.

Volunteer organizations
Huntsville has two volunteer public safety organizations in their city. The Huntsville-Madison County Rescue Squad is the county wide volunteer rescue organization with tasks ranging from vehicle extrication to water rescues. The other is the Huntsville Cave Rescue Unit which is the region's only all-volunteer cave rescue organization. It is tasked with cave, cliff and high angle rope rescues. These organizations are located in Huntsville but operate both in the city and outside with HCRU, responding to many cave rescue calls coming from caves well outside the city limits.

Emergency medical services
Huntsville Emergency Medical Services, Inc. (HEMSI) provides emergency medical services to Huntsville and surrounding Madison county. HEMSI operates from 12 stations with a fleet of 36 ambulances.

Police
The Huntsville Police Department has three precincts and one downtown headquarters, over 500 sworn officers, 200 civilian personnel, and patrols an area of approximately 220 square miles. The department also boasts its own academy, which has been in operation since 1965.

Huntsville spent $1.2 million in 2015 to buy body cameras to be used by the Huntsville Police Department. Mayor Tommy Battle pushed for the purchase of the body cameras, saying: "We can provide a trust situation with police and our general public." He also said: "Having that body cam there, having the police video there record what actually happens, and when people come in with complaints against Huntsville police officers, they get to see the action that actually happened."

Following the conviction of a former Huntsville police officer for murder, after he was originally cleared of any wrongdoing by the Police department, the City of Huntsville voted to change the way police shootings are reviewed. Beginning in August 2021, all shootings that result in death that occur by Huntsville Police are to be investigated by the Alabama Law Enforcement Agency instead. The first investigation following the policy change started in January 2022 after an off-duty Huntsville police officer allegedly killed his girlfriend. The officer had initially reported the death as a suicide, however it was later investigated as a homicide.

An advisory council created by the city described actions by Huntsville Police department (HPD) as being "in a manner that was, at a minimum, unprofessional and on multiple occasions in violation of HPD policy."

Hospitals

Huntsville Hospital in the downtown area is the largest hospital and trauma center. In 2021, Huntsville Hospital opened the Orthopedic & Spine Tower, a seven-story building with 24 surgical orthopedic suites, which brings the total bed count to 881 for Huntsville Hospital. Located further south, Crestwood Medical Center is a smaller, 180-bed teaching hospital that is ranked nationally in two specialties.

Notable people
Notable people from Huntsville include co-founder of Wikipedia Jimmy Wales, professional wrestler Bobby Eaton, film composer and musician Mervyn Warren, and early-20th century actress Tallulah Bankhead.

Sister cities
Huntsville's only sister city is:
 Tainan, Taiwan

References

Further reading

External links

 
 Huntsville/Madison County Convention & Visitors Bureau
 Huntsville History Collection

 
Cities in Alabama
Cities in Limestone County, Alabama
Cities in Madison County, Alabama
County seats in Alabama
Alabama
Huntsville-Decatur, AL Combined Statistical Area
Populated places established in 1805
Alabama populated places on the Tennessee River
Special economic zones of the United States
1809 establishments in the United States